Moe Set Wine (born Wai Wai Khine on 20 May 1988) is a Burmese model, actress and beauty pageant titleholder who won the Miss Universe Myanmar 2013 and represented Myanmar at the Miss Universe 2013 competition in Moscow on 9 November. She was the first woman to represent the country in the competition since 1961.

Early life and education
Moe Set Wine was born in Yangon on 20 May 1988 from Chinese ethnic's Father & Shan (Tai) ethnic's Mother. She graduated from Dagon University with a degree in English. She later went on to pursue her undergraduate studies in the United States and graduated with a Bachelors of Arts degree in marketing from California Lutheran University.

Competitions
In 2009, Moe Set Wine, under the name of 楊鑫榮 (Yang Xinrong), went to compete and placed second in a Burmese Chinese beauty pageant held by a local newspaper, Golden Phoenix.

Miss Universe Myanmar 2013

Moe Set Wine competed in Miss Universe Myanmar 2013 which was held on 3 October 2013 at the National Theatre in Yangon. The competition was organized by the Hello Madam Media Group. This competition was held for the first time since 1961. She won Miss Perfect Skin and Miss Famous titles, voted by fans through the Internet voting system and SMS messages. She became the winner of Miss Universe Myanmar 2013 after the competition.

She founded a local charity group named "Myanmar's Heart" on 9 January 2015.

Controversy
After Chinese news outlets revealed Moe Set Wine's participation in a local Burmese Chinese pageant, some pockets of Burma's social media openly criticized her ancestry, questioning her citizenship status as well as whether a native-born Burmese of Chinese ancestry could represent Burma in pageants. A spokesperson for Hello Madam Media, which organized the 2013 Miss Universe Myanmar competition, stated that she holds Burmese citizenship, and that her parents, of Shan and Burmese descent, are from Namkham, in northern Shan State.

References

External links
Official Miss Myanmar website

1988 births
Living people
Burmese beauty pageant winners
Burmese female models
People from Yangon
California Lutheran University alumni
Burmese people of Chinese descent
Miss Universe 2013 contestants
Miss Universe Myanmar winners